Convoy ON 92 was a trade convoy of merchant ships during the Second World War. It was the 92nd of the numbered series of ON convoys Outbound from the British Isles to North America. The ships departed from Liverpool on 6 May 1942 and were joined on 7 May by Mid-Ocean Escort Force Group A-3.

The convoy was discovered by Wolfpack Hecht on 11 May; seven ships were sunk before the U-boats lost contact with the convoy on 13 May. Surviving ships reached Halifax, Nova Scotia on 21 May.

Prelude
ON 92 was a west-bound convoy of 42 ships, either in ballast or carrying trade goods, and sailed from Liverpool on 6 May 1942 bound for ports in North America. Convoy commodore was Capt. R Gill in Southern Princess.

It was escorted by mid-ocean escort group A-3, comprising the destroyer Gleaves (Capt. J Heffernan as SOE), the US Coast Guard cutter Spencer, and four corvettes Algoma, Arvida, Bittersweet and Shediac. The convoy was supported by a rescue ship, the North Sea packet Bury. Two of the merchant ships were equipped as CAM ships, with a catapult-launched Hurricane fighter as temporary air cover.
Heffernan had a background in destroyers and anti-submarine warfare but was inexperienced in convoy protection, as was his group. Only Bittersweet had the new 10cm radar, and only the rescue ship Bury had HF/DF.

ON 92's passage was barred by the patrol group Hecht, comprising six Type VII U-boats. Of these two commanders were experienced Knight's Cross holders, while the others were on their first Atlantic patrol.

Action
After making rendezvous with its ocean escort ON 92 proceeded west, following along the great circle route to reduce distance. However German intelligence (B-Dienst) was aware of its passage, and U-Boat Command was able to send group Hecht in pursuit.
On the morning of 11 May U-569 made contact and began to shadow. Its transmissions were detected by Bury, which was confirmed by the Admiralty that afternoon but Heffernan made no response until 1700, when he led Gleaves and Spencer in a wide sweep around the convoy. At 1749 Gleaves sighted a U-boat 17 miles ahead and both proceeded to attack, continuing until  after midnight. Meanwhile two more U-boats were in contact, U-94 and U-124, both commanded by Knights Cross holders. After sunset the commodore ordered evasive maneuvers, but without success, and at 2300 U-124 attacked, sinking Empire Dell and damaging Llanover. A second attack by U-124 hit Mount Parnes and Cristales, while U-94 hit Cocles. Algoma sighted one and counter-attacked but with no success. At this point Gleaves and Spencer rejoined the convoy and no more attacks developed. Arvida and Shediac were able to pick up survivors, with Bury.

On 12 May the three U-boats in contact were joined by three more Hecht boats, U-96, U-406 and U-590, and all six continued to shadow. 
At 1300 Heffernan again detached Gleaves and Spencer in a sweep around the convoy; at 1943 Spencer sighted two U-boats 27 miles NW of the convoy, and engaged with gunfire, while at the same time Gleaves made a sonar contact 18 miles SE and again began an anti-submarine hunt.
At 2253 the U-boats around the convoy attacked again, U-94 hitting Batna. She was counter-attacked by Bittersweet, but escaped. Both ships with both firing star-shell, which brought Gleaves and Spencer back to the convoy. 
At 0310 on 13 May U-94 had a final success, hitting Tolken, but was driven off by defensive gunfire from the merchant. At this point foul weather closed in and the pack lost contact.

No further attacks developed and on 13 May Bury, with 178 survivors on board, was detached to St Johns, escorted by Arvida.

The convoy was joined by the Western Local escort on 17 may and made port at Halifax on 21 May.

Aftermath
ON 92 lost seven ships of a total of 42 that set out.
The Admiralty and Western Approaches Command were unimpressed with Heffernan's performance, particularly as he described it in his report as a success, commenting 'all escorts are entitled to credit for a highly satisfactory performance'. WAC disagreed, feeling the group had 'failed lamentably' in its defence of ON 92. The commodores report sums up the episode by commenting 'Gleaves was never there when ON 92 was attacked'. After this Heffernan was moved to other duties, with leadership of A-3 being passed to USCG commander P Heineman of cutter Campbell.

BdU had reason to be pleased with the sinking of seven merchant ships from the convoy, although this was the only successful attack on any North Atlantic convoy in the month of May. It was also noticeable that the only success fell to the two experienced commanders; the other four Hecht skippers achieved nothing.

Ships in the convoy

Merchant ships

Convoy escorts

U-boats
The convoy was attacked by Wolfpack Hecht, which consisted of U-boats, namely:
 (Type VIIC) : 3 ships sunk
 (Type VIIC) : no success
 Type XB : supply boat
 Type IXB : 4 ships sunk
  (Type VIIC) : no success
  (Type VIIC) : no success
  (Type VIIC) : no success
  (Type VIIC) : no success

References

Bibliography
 Blair, Clay (1996) Hitler's U-boat War Vol I 
 Edwards, Bernard (1996) Donitz and the Wolf Packs

External links
ON.92 at convoyweb
ONS-92 at uboat.net

ON092
Naval battles of World War II involving Canada